Living Eyes is the Bee Gees' sixteenth original album (fourteenth internationally), released in 1981. The album featured more of a soft rock sound compared to the disco and R&B of their mid-to-late 1970s work. It was also the band's final album on RSO Records, which would be absorbed into Polydor and subsequently discontinued. While it did not sell well in either the UK or the US, the album itself was a top 40 hit in the majority of territories in which it saw wide release.

Overview
Following the massive success from the Bee Gees production of Barbra Streisand's album Guilty, the Bee Gees regrouped at Middle Ear studios in October 1980 to record their next album. They began work on some of the songs that would go onto Living Eyes. As they had been on all their recordings since 1975, they were backed by Blue Weaver (keyboards, synthesisers, programming), Alan Kendall (lead guitar), and Dennis Bryon (drums, percussion), but the sessions broke down and the three backing musicians were fired. Alan Kendall would return to working with the Bee Gees in 1989, and he remained with them for the rest of their recording and touring career.

Recording
Recording began early in 1981 without the Bee Gees band that recorded and toured with the group in the late 1970s. Barry felt that he could create the sound he wanted with sessions musicians instead of a band, and the album featured musicians including Don Felder, Jeff Porcaro, Richard Tee, George Terry and Steve Gadd. Also, the Bee Gees stated that they were trying to avoid being pigeonholed as a disco act, which was why the album also featured minimal falsetto vocals (which had become a Bee Gees trademark by that time), with one notable exception being the song "Soldiers".

Barry, along with producers Albhy Galuten and Karl Richardson had developed their own production style, with Spirits Having Flown and Barbra Streisand's #1 album Guilty. But Robin and Maurice had become active in the studio again, contributing more to vocals and production, which created some tension between them and the Gibb-Galuten-Richardson production team. Galuten later commented on why Living Eyes failed to impact both US and UK charts:

"There was a tremendous fear, that we had fallen into a rut, and I felt strongly on Living Eyes that it was time to change. When we started working on [it] and it was not being fun, I remember sitting around with my friends at the time, and saying, 'It's just not working and I think that I'm going to leave.'"

Living Eyes also features the return of Robin and Maurice Gibb as a lead vocalist since 1975 in a whole song. As Barry says that his falsetto was the reason why Robin (or Maurice) had not taken lead vocals (in a whole track) on any song by the group between 1976 and 1979: "'God, every falsetto record we're putting out is a monster, we shouldn't change yet.' That's what stopped us from saying, 'Well it's time Robin had a lead.' But now it's no longer a sales point, it's important that Robin's voice get heard. It's equally important that Maurice's voice gets heard. And it's becoming less important that I get heard. And that's the way we work. There's no ego within the three of us, whoever's singing most or whoever has the most hits is irrelevant."

Critical reception

Sales of Living Eyes were far lower than those of their previous album, Spirits Having Flown. In the US, the disco backlash was still strong, and many radio stations were not even playing the Bee Gees by 1981. Also, RSO Records had fallen out of the position to promote and sell records it had once held. Promotional staff had been cut to the bone mid-year because they had simply had no product to sell. There was also a Bee Gees lawsuit going on against Robert Stigwood and RSO Records, which did not help matters.

The Bee Gees themselves subsequently dismissed this album as weak, and having been recorded under pressure from their record company and management at a time when they needed to rethink their direction. Despite this, Barry commented about Living Eyes following its release, "It's our finest album in terms of depth, performance and quality of the production. It's been about 11 months working on this album, and we do tend to work an awful long time on our albums because we want to be sure." But in 1984, Barry admitted: "Obviously, we had a scare with Living Eyes. It wasn't the kind of album we should have brought out at that point. It was a little too downbeat, as opposed to having energy. But we were trying to go for a change, to draw ourselves away from the falsetto vocals and do something that might be a little different. We knew the risks when we did that."

Barry claimed, in 1990, "Living Eyes was just what was needed for us. We needed to stop being what we were. It was driving us all round the twist. We needed at that point to step back and look at our lives as individuals."

Compact Disc release

Living Eyes was chosen to be the first ever album to be manufactured on CD for demonstration purposes, as seen on the BBC TV program Tomorrow's World in 1981, and was featured on the inaugural issue of the Compact Disc trade magazine. It was the first Bee Gees album to be released on CD, in early 1983 when compact discs were first commercially available, though few were manufactured.

Track listing
All songs written by Barry, Robin and Maurice Gibb except where noted.

Outtakes
"Heart (Stop Beating in Time)" (later recorded by Leo Sayer and released as a single in 1982, followed by Marilyn McCoo and her single release in 1983)
"Hold Her in Your Hand" (Barry Gibb, Maurice Gibb) (later recorded by Maurice Gibb in 1984 for the soundtrack to A Breed Apart)
"Heat of the Night" – 4:02
"Loving You Is Killing Me"
"Mind over Matter" – 4:30
"The Promise You Made" – 3:14

Personnel
Credits from Joseph Brennan.

Bee Gees
Barry Gibb – vocals, acoustic rhythm guitar, string and horn arrangements
Robin Gibb – vocals
Maurice Gibb – vocals, acoustic rhythm guitar, string and horn arrangements

Guest and additional musicians
Don Felder – guitar on "He's A Liar," "Paradise," "Don't Fall In Love With Me," "Soldiers," "Wildflower", and “Be Who You Are”
Richard Tee – piano on "Living Eyes," "He's A Liar," "Paradise," "Don't Fall In Love With Me," "Soldiers," "I Still Love You," and "Nothing Could Be Good"
Albhy Galuten – synthesizer on "Living Eyes," "He's A Liar," "Paradise," "Soldiers," "I Still Love You," "Cryin' Everyday," and "Be Who You Are"
 George Bitzer – piano on "Living Eyes," "Paradise," "Wildflower," and "Nothing Could Be Good," and synthesizer on "He's A Liar"
 Harold Cowart – bass except "Cryin' Everyday" and "Be Who You Are"
Steve Gadd – drums on "He's A Liar," "Paradise," "Don't Fall In Love With Me," "Soldiers," "I Still Love You," and "Nothing Could Be Good"
 Chuck Kirkpatrick – guitar on "Living Eyes," "Nothing Could Be Good," and "I Still Love You"
 George Terry – guitar on "Living Eyes" and "Be Who You Are"
 David Wolinski – keyboards on "Be Who You Are"
Bob Glaub – bass on "Be Who You Are"
Jeff Porcaro – drums on "Living Eyes," "Soldiers," and "Cryin' Everyday"
Russ Kunkel – drums on "Wildflower," "Cryin' Everyday," and "Be Who You Are"
Ralph MacDonald – percussion on "Living Eyes," "He's A Liar," and "Don't Fall in Love With Me"
Joe Galdo – drums on "Be Who You Are"

The Boneroo Horns and Brass Sextet
 Peter Graves on "He's a Liar", "Don't Fall in Love With Me", "Be Who You Are"
 Ken Faulk on "He's a Liar", "Don't Fall in Love With Me", "Be Who You Are"
 Brett Murphey on "He's a Liar", "Don't Fall in Love With Me", "Be Who You Are"
 Neil Bonsanti on "He's a Liar"
 Don Bonsanti on "He's a Liar"
 Whit Sidener on "He's a Liar"
 Jerry Peel on "Don't Fall in Love With Me", "Be Who You Are"
 Greg Lonnman on "Don't Fall in Love With Me", "Be Who You Are"
 Ken Waldenpfhul on "Don't Fall in Love With Me", "Be Who You Are"
 Gene Orloff – concertmaster
 Karl Richardson – sound engineer
Don Gehman – sound engineer

Charts

Certifications and sales

References

Bee Gees albums
1981 albums
RSO Records albums
Albums produced by Barry Gibb
Albums produced by Robin Gibb
Albums produced by Maurice Gibb